L'Observatoire International is a lighting design firm established by Hervé Descottes in 1993 in New York City. The firm works within a range of different spatial expressions including architecture, landscape, urban, and fine art projects.

L'Observatoire has become known for its innovative ways of applying light within the built environment, and does so by merging the latest technologies with an aesthetic paradigm in order to most advantageously engage and reveal the program, space, and form. The firm has collaborated with architects and designers including Steven Holl, Frank Gehry, Diller Scofidio + Renfro, Jean Nouvel, Richard Meier, Peter Marino.

Recent notable works
 Le Louvre, Agence Search, Paris, France (Under Construction)
 Le Nouvel Ardmore, Ateliers jean Nouvel, Singapore (2015)
 Faena Hotel Miami Beach, Bazmark, Miami, FL, USA  (2015)
 Philharmonie de Paris, Ateliers Jean Nouvel, Paris, France (2015)
 Seamarq Hotel, Richard Meier Partners, Gengneung, South Korea (2015)
 House of Dior Seoul, Peter Marino Architects, Christian de Partzamparc, Seoul, South Korea (2015)
 Metropolitan Museum, Olin Partnership, New York NY, USA (2014)
 Aspen Museum of Art, Shigeru Ban Architects, Aspen, CO, USA  (2014)
 Fondation Louis Vuitton, Gehry Partners, Paris, France (2014)
 Hotel Bayerischer Hof, Agence Jouin Manku, Munich, Germany (2014)
 Fendi Avenue Montaigne, Curiosity, Paris, France (2014)
 Vik Vinery, Smijan Radic, Millahue, Chile (2014)
 Conrad Hotel, KPF, New York, NY, USA (2012)
 Daeyang Gallery & Guesthouse, Steven Holl Architects, Seoul, Korea (2012)
 Museum of the Moving Image, Leeser Architecture, Queens, NY (2011)
 Cite de l'Ocean et du Surf, Steven Holl Architects, Biarritz, France (2011)
 Beekman Tower, Gehry Partners, LLP, New York, NY (2011)
 Virginia Museum of Fine Arts, Rick Mather Architects + SMBW, Richmond, VA (2011)
Steel Stacks Campus, Wallace Roberts & Todd, Bethlehem, PA (2011)
 Vanke Center, Steven Holl Architects, Shenzen, China (2011)
Taikoo Place, Wong & Ouyang, Hong Kong, China (2010)
Marc Jacobs Tokyo, Stephan Jakitsch Architects, Tokyo, Japan (2010)
Guggenheim Abu Dhabi, Gehry Partners, LLP, Abu Dhabi (2010)
Hermes Rive Gauche, Rene Dumas, Architecture Interieure, Paris, France (2010)
ABC Kitchen, Jan Burtz, Jim Denney, Eric Slayton, New York, NY (2010)
Les Lalanne, Musee de Arts Decoratifs, Peter Marino Architects, Paris, France (2010)
Lincoln Center Redevelopment: Alice Tully Hall, Diller, Scorfidio + Renfro, New York, NY (2009)
The High Line, Field Operations, New York, NY (2009)
The Standard Hotel, Polshek Partnership Architects, New York, NY (2009)
Art Gallery of Ontario, Gehry Partners, LLP, Toronto, Canada (2008)
Newtown Creek Wastewater Treatment Plant, Polshek Partnership (now Ennead Architects), Brooklyn, NY (2008)
The Pink Project: Make It Right Foundation, Graft, Founder: Brad Pitt, New Orleans, LA (2008)
Louis Vuitton Foundation for Creation, Gehry Partners, LLP, Paris, France (2008)
Lou Ruvo Center for Brain Health, Gehry Partners, LLP, Las Vegas, NV (2008)
Novartis, Gehry Partners, LLP, Basel, Switzerland (2008)
The French Presidency of the European Union, Agence Sylvain Dubuisson, Brussels, Belgium (2007)
Vivocity, Toyo Ito & Associates, Singapore (2007)
Musée des Arts Décoratifs, Sylvain Dubuisson, Paris, France (2007)
Guthrie Theater, Atelier Jean Nouvel, Minneapolis, MN (2006)
Buffalo Bayou: Sabine to Bagby Promenade, SWA Group, Houston, TX (2006)
Columbus Circle, Olin Partnership, New York, NY (2005)
Bronx Museum, Architectonica, New York, NY (2006)
Leeum Samsung Museum of Art, Atelier Jean Nouvel, OMA/Rem Koolhas, Seoul, Korea (2004)
Walt-Disney Concert Hall, Frank O. Gehry & Associates, Los Angeles, CA (2003)
Bellevue Arts Museum, Steven Holl Architects, Bellevue, WA (2001)
Langston Hughes Library, Maya lin Studio, Clinton, TN (2000)
Kiasma Museum of Contemporary Art, Steven Holl Architects, Helsinki, Finland (1998)
Cranbrook Institute of Science, Steven Holl Architects, Bloomfield Hills, MI (1998)

Awards

Awards 

 2016 -- Architizer Award for Fondation Louis Vuitton (Paris, France)
 2015 -- IES Illumination Award for The Metropolitan of Arts (New York, USA)
 2014 -- Global Awards for Excellence for Steel Stacks Campus (Bethlehem, PA)
 2014 -- Architizer Award for The High Line (New York, USA)
 2014 -- Lumen Award for Les Haras Strasbourg (Strasbourg, France)
 2014 -- IES Illumination Award for Private Residence in Fire Island (Fire Island, USA)
 2014 -- IES Illumination Award for Lafayette Grand Cafe (New York, USA)
 2014 -- IES Illumination Award for "Les Haras Strasbourg (Strasbourg, France)
IES Illumination Award for Le Ciel de Paris (Paris, France) (2013)
IES Illumination Award for Conrad Hotel (New York, NY) (2013)
IES Illumination Award for Daeyang House and Gallery (Seoul, South Korea) (2013)
IES Illumination Award for Vintry Fine Wines (New York, NY) (2013)
IES Illumination Award for the Virgin Atlantic JFK Clubhouse (New York, NY) (2013) 
IALD Award awarded to Cite du Surf et de L'Ocean (Biarritz, France) (2013)
GE Edison Award (highest honor) for Vintry Fine Wines (New York, NY) (2013)
 Lumen Award of Merit awarded to the following projects: Cite du Surf et de L'Ocean (Biarritz, France) and The High Line (New York, NY) (2012)
 IALD Award of Special Citation for Sensitive Application of Light in a Repurposed Urban Setting for The High Line (New York, NY) (2012)
 IES Illuminations award of Merit Awarded to the following projects: The Cosmopolitan (Las Vegas, NV), Hermes Rive Gauche (Paris, France), Cite du Surf et de L'Ocean (Biarritz, France), and The High Line (New York, NY) (2012)
 Wan Awards Retail Interior Award for RDAI's Hermes Store (Paris, France) (2011)
 Municipal Arts Society's Masterworks Award Best Restoration for the Queens Theatre in the Park (Queens, NY) (2011)
Lumen Award of Merit for Lincoln Center Redevelopment: Alice Tully Hall and the Juilliard School(New York, NY) and Private Residence (Kuala Lumpur, Malaysia) (2010)
 World Architecture News Award in Civic Building Category for the New York Korea Cultural Center (New York, NY)(2010)
 IES Illuminations award of Merit Awarded to the following projects: Newton Creek Waste Water Pollution Treatment Plant (New York, NY), The High Line (New York, NY), and Lincoln Center Redevelopment: Alice Tully Hall and the Juilliard School (New York, NY)(2010)
 Best Redesign awarded by The Municipal Art Society of New York Awarded to the following projects: Lincoln Center Redevelopment: Alice Tully Hall (New York, NY) and The High Line (New York, NY)(2010)
 Commendable Achievement Exterior Lighting from Architectural Lighting Magazine’s Sixth Annual Light and Architecture Design Awards for Newtown Creek Wastewater Treatment Plant (Brooklyn, NY)(2009
 ASLA Design Excellence Award for Buffalo Bayou: Sabine to Bagby Promenade (Houston, TX)(2009)
 Chevalier des Arts et LettresKnight of Arts and Letters Award administered by the Minister of Culture and the Government of France (2008)
 Award of Merit from the American Institute of Architects (AIA) for Theory World Headquarters and Retail Flagship (New York, NY)(2008)
 Yellow Pencil Award from D&AD (British Design and Art Direction) for Environmental Design/Installation for the Make It Right Foundation’s Pink Project with Graft as architect (New Orleans, LA)(2008)
 Award of Excellence from the American Society of Landscape Architects for the Buffalo Bayou: Sabine to Bagby Promenade (Houston, TX)(2007)
 General Design Award of Honor from ASLA for Columbus Circle (New York, NY)(2006)
 Institute Honor from Collaborative Achievement in Design American Institute of Architects (AIA)(2003)
 Award for Excellence in Design from the Art Commission of New York City for the exterior lighting of the P.S.1 Contemporary Art Center in Long Island City (New York, NY) (2003)

Book Publications

References

External links
 Official website

Companies based in New York City
Architectural lighting design